Vancouver Centre was a provincial electoral district for the Legislative Assembly of British Columbia, Canada. It was created before the general election of 1933. It and the other new Vancouver ridings that came into existence that yearVancouver-Burrard, Vancouver-Point Grey and Vancouver Eastwere created from the old Vancouver City riding, which was a six-member seat. Vancouver Centre was a two-member seat throughout its existence.

For a full listing of Vancouver ridings, historical and current, please see Vancouver (electoral districts).

Demographics

Notable MLAs 

Alexander Small Matthew
Leslie Raymond Peterson
Herb Capozzi
Evan Maurice Wolfe
Mike Harcourt
Gary Lauk
Emery Barnes

Notable candidates

Electoral history 1933-1986 

|-

|Liberal
|Gordon McGregor Sloan
|align="right"|6,925 	 	
|align="right"|24.45%

|Liberal
|Gordon Sylvester Wismer
|align="right"|6,723 	
|align="right"|23.74%

|Co-operative Commonwealth Fed.
|Wallis Walter LeFeaux
|align="right"|5,352 		
|align="right"|18.90%

|Co-operative Commonwealth Fed.
|James Samuel Taylor
|align="right"|5,102 			
|align="right"|18.01%

|Independent Conservative
|Daryl Herbert Kent
|align="right"|1,437 		
|align="right"|5.07%

|Independent Conservative
|Albert DeBurgo McPhillips
|align="right"|1,304 	
|align="right"|4.60%

|Independent CCF
|Gerald Vincent Pelton
|align="right"|407 		
|align="right"|1.44%

|Independent CCF
|Henry Edward Lyon
|align="right"|293 	
|align="right"|1.03%

|- bgcolor="white"
!align="right" colspan=3|Total valid votes
!align="right"|28,323
!align="right"|100.00%
|- bgcolor="white"
!align="right" colspan=3|Total rejected ballots
!align="right"|138

|Liberal
|Gordon Sylvester Wismer
|align="right"|6,444 	
|align="right"|18.63%

|Liberal
|Fred Crone
|align="right"|6,377 			
|align="right"|18.44%

|Co-operative Commonwealth Fed.
|Matthew Glenday
|align="right"|5,771 	
|align="right"|16.68%

|Co-operative Commonwealth Fed.
|Frank Roberts
|align="right"|5,690 	
|align="right"|16.45%

|Conservative
|Montague Gregory Caple
|align="right"|4,214 	
|align="right"|12.18%

|Conservative
|Adam Smith Johnston
|align="right"|4,047 	
|align="right"|11.70%

|- bgcolor="white"
!align="right" colspan=3|Total valid votes
!align="right"|34,590 
!align="right"|100.00%
!align="right"|
|- bgcolor="white"
!align="right" colspan=3|Total rejected ballots
!align="right"|400
|}

For the elimination-ballot elections of 1952 and 1953 the riding's voters were presented with two ballots, one for each seat, with two separate candidate-races:

|-

|Co-operative Commonwealth Fed.
|James Campbell Bury
|align="right"|6,912         
|align="right"|31.02% 
|align="right"|9,363  
|align="right"|54.06%
|align="right"|
|align="right"|unknown

|Liberal
|Anna Ethel Sprott
|align="right"|5,234      	 	                   
|align="right"|23.49% 
|align="right"|7,956
|align="right"|45.94% 
|align="right"|
|align="right"|unknown

|Progressive Conservative
|Allan James McDonell
|align="right"|4,120     	                    
|align="right"|18.49%  
|align="right"| - 
|align="right"| -.- % 
|align="right"|
|align="right"|unknown

|Labour Representation Committee
|Orville Garfield Braaten
|align="right"|654     	 	 	                  
|align="right"|2.94%
|align="right"| -   
|align="right"| -.- %
|align="right"|
|align="right"|unknown
|- bgcolor="white"
!align="right" colspan=3|Total valid votes
!align="right"|22,281      	        
!align="right"|100.00%
!align="right"|17,319       
!align="right"|%
!align="right"|
|- bgcolor="white"
!align="right" colspan=3|Total rejected ballots
!align="right"|2,119
!align="right"|
!align="right"|
|- bgcolor="white"
!align="right" colspan=3|Turnout
!align="right"|%
!align="right"|
!align="right"|
|- bgcolor="white"
!align="right" colspan=9|1 Preferential ballot; first and final of five (5) counts only shown.
|}	  	

|Co-operative Commonwealth Fed.
|Laura Emma Marshall Jamieson
|align="right"|7,350         
|align="right"|33.17% 
|align="right"|9,893
|align="right"|53.80%

|Liberal
|Gordon Sylvester Wismer
|align="right"|5,394    	                 
|align="right"|24.34%
|align="right"|8,496  
|align="right"|46.20%

|Progressive Conservative
|Frederick Wellington Taylor
|align="right"|3,951    	 	                 
|align="right"|17.83% 
 
   
|- bgcolor="white"
!align="right" colspan=3|Total valid votes
!align="right"|22,159        
!align="right"|100.00%
!align="right"| 18,389   
|- bgcolor="white"
!align="right" colspan=3|Total rejected ballots
!align="right"|1,901
|- bgcolor="white"
!align="right" colspan=9|2 Preferential ballot; first and final of five (5) counts only shown.
|}	  	

|-

|Co-operative Commonwealth Fed.
|James Campbell Bury 	 	
|align="right"|6,238 	 	 		 	 	  
|align="right"|32.10% 
|align="right"|7,757 	 
|align="right"|46.25%
|align="right"|
|align="right"|unknown

|Liberal
|Anna Ethel Sprott
|align="right"|4,079 	 		 	 		                    
|align="right"|20.99%  
|align="right"| - 
|align="right"| -.- %
|align="right"|
|align="right"|unknown

|Progressive Conservative
|Glenholme Ferguson McMaster
|align="right"|971 	  	 	 	 		 		
|align="right"|5.00%
|align="right"| - 
|align="right"| -.- %
|align="right"|
|align="right"|unknown

|- bgcolor="white"
!align="right" colspan=3|Total valid votes
!align="right"|19,431
!align="right"|100.00%
!align="right"|16,773   
!align="right"|%
!align="right"|
|- bgcolor="white"
!align="right" colspan=3|Total rejected ballots
!align="right"|1,638 	
!align="right"|
!align="right"|
!align="right"|
!align="right"|
|- bgcolor="white"
!align="right" colspan=3|Total Registered Voters
!align="right"|
!align="right"|
!align="right"|
!align="right"|
!align="right"|
|- bgcolor="white"
!align="right" colspan=3|Turnout
!align="right"|%
!align="right"|
!align="right"|
!align="right"|
!align="right"|
|- bgcolor="white"
!align="right" colspan=9|3 Preferential ballot; first and final of five (5) counts only shown.
|}

|-

|Co-operative Commonwealth Fed.
|Laura Emma Marshall Jamieson 	 	
|align="right"|6,283 	 	 		  	 	  
|align="right"|32.87% 
|align="right"|7,707
|align="right"|47.03%
|align="right"|
|align="right"|unknown

|Liberal
|Michael Leo Sweeney
|align="right"|3,985 		 	 	                   
|align="right"|20.85%  
|align="right"| - 	 	 
|align="right"| -.- %
|align="right"|
|align="right"|unknown

|Progressive Conservative
|Frederick Wellington Taylor	
|align="right"|1,007 	 	  	 	  
|align="right"|5.27% 
|align="right"| - 
|align="right"| -.- %
|align="right"|
|align="right"|unknown

|- bgcolor="white"
!align="right" colspan=3|Total valid votes
!align="right"|19,117
!align="right"|100.00%
!align="right"|16,386    
!align="right"|%
!align="right"|
|- bgcolor="white"
!align="right" colspan=3|Total rejected ballots
!align="right"|1,727
!align="right"|
!align="right"|
!align="right"|
!align="right"|
|- bgcolor="white"
!align="right" colspan=3|Total Registered Voters
!align="right"|
!align="right"|
!align="right"|
!align="right"|
!align="right"|
|- bgcolor="white"
!align="right" colspan=3|Turnout
!align="right"|%
!align="right"|
!align="right"|
!align="right"|
!align="right"|
|- bgcolor="white"
!align="right" colspan=9|4 Preferential ballot; first and final of five (5) counts only shown.
|}

|-

|Co-operative Commonwealth Fed.
|Charles Patrick (Paddy) Neale 	
|align="right"|4,561 	
|align="right"|12.56% 
|align="right"|
|align="right"|unknown

|Co-operative Commonwealth Fed.
|William Giesbrecht 	 	
|align="right"|4,393 	
|align="right"|12.10% 
|align="right"|
|align="right"|unknown

|Liberal
|James Allen Macdonald
|align="right"|3,996 	
|align="right"|11.01%  
|align="right"|
|align="right"|unknown

|Liberal
|Ralph Goodman
|align="right"|3,727 	
|align="right"|10.27%  
|align="right"|
|align="right"|unknown

|Progressive Conservative
|Reginald Atherton
|align="right"|969 	 	
|align="right"|2.67%
|align="right"|
|align="right"|unknown

|- bgcolor="white"
!align="right" colspan=3|Total valid votes
!align="right"|36,302
!align="right"|100.00%
!align="right"|
|- bgcolor="white"
!align="right" colspan=3|Total rejected ballots
!align="right"|168
!align="right"|
!align="right"|
|- bgcolor="white"
!align="right" colspan=3|Turnout
!align="right"|%
!align="right"|
!align="right"|
|}

|-

|Co-operative Commonwealth Fed.
|Thomas Henry Berger	 	
|align="right"|6,530 	 
|align="right"|16.03% 
|align="right"|
|align="right"|unknown

|Co-operative Commonwealth Fed.
|William James Dennison	 	
|align="right"|6,378 	 
|align="right"|15.66% 
|align="right"|
|align="right"|unknown

|Liberal
|Charles Jordan-Knox
|align="right"|3,726 	
|align="right"|9.15%  
|align="right"|
|align="right"|unknown

|Liberal
|Henry Greer Castillou
|align="right"|3,724 	
|align="right"|9.14%  
|align="right"|
|align="right"|unknown

|Progressive Conservative
|Patrick Lockhart Reid
|align="right"|1,421 	 		
|align="right"|3.49%
|align="right"|
|align="right"|unknown

|Progressive Conservative
|Lawrence Smith Eckhardt
|align="right"|1,411 		
|align="right"|3.46%
|align="right"|
|align="right"|unknown

|- bgcolor="white"
!align="right" colspan=3|Total valid votes
!align="right"|40,733 	
!align="right"|100.00%
!align="right"|
|- bgcolor="white"
!align="right" colspan=3|Total rejected ballots
!align="right"|504
!align="right"|
!align="right"|
|- bgcolor="white"
!align="right" colspan=3|Turnout
!align="right"|%
!align="right"|
!align="right"|
|}

|-

|Liberal
|Thomas Warnett Kennedy
|align="right"|3,477 	 	
|align="right"|8.74%
|align="right"|
|align="right"|unknown

|Liberal
|Alexander Forst
|align="right"|3,467 	
|align="right"|8.72%
|align="right"|
|align="right"|unknown

|Progressive Conservative
|Harold G. Haggart
|align="right"|2,741 		
|align="right"|6.89%
|align="right"|
|align="right"|unknown

|Progressive Conservative
|Arthur L. Johnson
|align="right"|2,588 	 		
|align="right"|6.51%
|align="right"|
|align="right"|unknown

|- bgcolor="white"
!align="right" colspan=3|Total valid votes
!align="right"|39,777 
!align="right"|100.00%
!align="right"|
|- bgcolor="white"
!align="right" colspan=3|Total rejected ballots
!align="right"|419
!align="right"|
!align="right"|
|- bgcolor="white"
!align="right" colspan=3|Turnout
!align="right"|%
!align="right"|
!align="right"|
|}

|-

|Liberal
|William Griffiths Black
|align="right"|4,147 	 	
|align="right"|10.75%
|align="right"|
|align="right"|unknown

|Liberal
|Phillip James Lipp
|align="right"|3,803 	 	
|align="right"|9.86%
|align="right"|
|align="right"|unknown

|Independent
|Gerard A. Goeujon
|align="right"|144 	 	
|align="right"|0.37%
|align="right"|unknown
|- bgcolor="white"
!align="right" colspan=3|Total valid votes
!align="right"|38,570  	
!align="right"|100.00%
!align="right"|
|- bgcolor="white"
!align="right" colspan=3|Total rejected ballots
!align="right"|432
!align="right"|
!align="right"|
|- bgcolor="white"
!align="right" colspan=3|Turnout
!align="right"|%
!align="right"|
!align="right"|
|}

|-

|Liberal
|Daniel Terence Devlin
|align="right"|4,551 	 	
|align="right"|9.22%
|align="right"|
|align="right"|unknown

|Liberal
|Robert Gary Miller
|align="right"|4,454 	
|align="right"|9.02%
|align="right"|
|align="right"|unknown
|- bgcolor="white"
!align="right" colspan=3|Total valid votes
!align="right"|49,354	 	
!align="right"|100.00%
!align="right"|
|- bgcolor="white"
!align="right" colspan=3|Total rejected ballots
!align="right"|528
!align="right"|
!align="right"|
|- bgcolor="white"
!align="right" colspan=3|Turnout
!align="right"|%
!align="right"|
!align="right"|
|}

|-

|Liberal
|Thomas Alexander Kennedy
|align="right"|4,869 			 	
|align="right"|9.11%
|align="right"|
|align="right"|unknown

|Liberal
|Henry Greer Castillou
|align="right"|4,751 		 	
|align="right"|8.89%
|align="right"|
|align="right"|unknown
|- bgcolor="white"
!align="right" colspan=3|Total valid votes
!align="right"|53,434 	
!align="right"|100.00%
!align="right"|
|- bgcolor="white"
!align="right" colspan=3|Total rejected ballots
!align="right"|539
!align="right"|
!align="right"|
|- bgcolor="white"
!align="right" colspan=3|Turnout
!align="right"|%
!align="right"|
!align="right"|
|}

|-

|Independent (Social Credit)
|Thomas Warnett Kennedy5
|align="right"|2,545 				 	
|align="right"|4.90%
|align="right"|
|align="right"|unknown

|Liberal
|Thomas Smith Hammond
|align="right"|1,949 				 	
|align="right"|3.75%
|align="right"|
|align="right"|unknown

|Liberal
|Jack Say Yee
|align="right"|1,870 				 	
|align="right"|3.60%
|align="right"|
|align="right"|unknown

|Progressive Conservative
|Malcolm Caldwell Wright
|align="right"|1,513 		 		
|align="right"|2.91%
|align="right"|
|align="right"|unknown

|Independent
|David John Bader
|align="right"|191 			 			
|align="right"|0.37%
|align="right"|
|align="right"|unknown

|- bgcolor="white"
!align="right" colspan=3|Total valid votes
!align="right"|51,937 
!align="right"|100.00%
!align="right"|
|- bgcolor="white"
!align="right" colspan=3|Total rejected ballots
!align="right"|669
!align="right"|
!align="right"|
|- bgcolor="white"
!align="right" colspan=3|Turnout
!align="right"|%
!align="right"|
!align="right"|
|- bgcolor="white"
!align="right" colspan=7|5   Campaigned as Ind.SC but listed as Independent in Statement of Votes since the Election Act prohibits the use of a recognized party name by Independent candidates.
|}

|-

|Progressive Conservative
|Douglas David Henderson
|align="right"|1,511 	 
|align="right"|2.43%
|align="right"|
|align="right"|unknown

|Progressive Conservative
|Keith Donald Eady
|align="right"|1,475 
|align="right"|2.37%
|align="right"|
|align="right"|unknown

|- bgcolor="white"
!align="right" colspan=3|Total valid votes
!align="right"|62,207 
!align="right"|100.00%
!align="right"|
|- bgcolor="white"
!align="right" colspan=3|Total rejected ballots
!align="right"|1,310
!align="right"|
!align="right"|
|- bgcolor="white"
!align="right" colspan=3|Turnout
!align="right"|%
!align="right"|
!align="right"|
|}

|-

|Liberal
|Steven R. Bourne
|align="right"|2,564 	 	
|align="right"|3.65%
|align="right"|
|align="right"|unknown

|Liberal
|Vito Palmieri
|align="right"|2,036 		 	
|align="right"|2.89%
|align="right"|
|align="right"|unknown

|- bgcolor="white"
!align="right" colspan=3|Total valid votes
!align="right"|70,337 	
!align="right"|100.00%
!align="right"|
|- bgcolor="white"
!align="right" colspan=3|Total rejected ballots
!align="right"|1,548
!align="right"|
!align="right"|
|- bgcolor="white"
!align="right" colspan=3|Turnout
!align="right"|%
!align="right"|
!align="right"|
|}

A redistribution before the 1991 election dramatically changed Vancouver's long-standing electoral map by the abandonment of the century-old tradition of multiple member districts.  Vancouver Centre was abolished.   Its principal successor ridings were Vancouver-Fairview, Vancouver-Mount Pleasant and Vancouver-Langara.  Some portions may have gone to Vancouver-Burrard or Vancouver-Little Mountain.

External links 
Elections BC Historical Returns

Former provincial electoral districts of British Columbia